

Coleoptera
 Carabidae
 Migadopini
 Lissopterus hyadesii falklandicus
 Lissopterus quadrinotatus
 Migadops latus lebruni
 Pseudomigadops falklandicus
 Pseudomigadops fuscus fuscus
 Pseudomigadops fuscus sericeus
 Pseudomigadops handkei handkei
 Pseudomigadops handkei punctatus
 etc.
 Curculionidae
 Cyclominae
 Antarctobius abditus
 Antarctobius bidentatus
 Antarctobius falklandicus
 Antarctobius malvinensis
 Antarctobius vulsus
 Falklandiellus suffodens
 Falklandius antarcticus
 Falklandius goliath
 Falklandius kuscheli
 Falklandius turbificatus
 Germainiellus salebrosus
 Haversiella albolimbata
 Lanteriella microphtalma [endemic genus/species]
 Puranius championi
 Puranius exculpticollis
 Puranius scaber
 Entiminae
 Caneorhinus biangulatus
 Cylydrorhinus caudiculatus
 Cylydrorhinus lemniscatus
 Malvinius compressiventris [endemic genus/species]
 Malvinius nordenskioeldi [endemic genus/species]
 Morronia brevirostris [endemic genus/species]
 etc.

References
  1999: Further notes on Migadopinae from the Falkland Islands (Insecta, Coleoptera, Carabidae). Spixiana, 22: 47-52. 
  2008: A preliminary overview of species composition and geographical distribution of Malvinian weevils (Insecta: Coleoptera: Curculionidae). Zootaxa, 1704: 1-26. Abstract & excerpt